The 1872 Richmond (Yorkshire) by-election was held on 4 November 1872.  The byelection was held due to the elevation to the peerage in order to become the Lord Chancellor of the incumbent MP of the Liberal Party, Roundell Palmer.  It was won by the Liberal candidate Lawrence Dundas.

References

1872 in England
Richmondshire
Richmond, North Yorkshire
1872 elections in the United Kingdom
By-elections to the Parliament of the United Kingdom in North Yorkshire constituencies
19th century in Yorkshire